Frederik van der Blij (13 May 1923, Leiden – 27 January 2018, Heino, Netherlands) was a Dutch mathematician. From 1955 until his retirement in 1988 he was professor at the University of Utrecht. His research focused on number theory, among other fields.

See also
Van der Blij's lemma

References

External links
 

1923 births
2018 deaths
Dutch mathematicians
Leiden University alumni
Academic staff of Utrecht University
People from Leiden